Canadian science fiction and fantasy authors:

A-G

 Kelley Armstrong
 Margaret Atwood
 Malcolm Azania
 R. Scott Bakker
 Stephanie Bedwell-Grime
 Erin Bow
 Paul Chafe
 Michael G. Coney
 Seán Cummings
 Julie E. Czerneda
 Charles de Lint
 Arinn Dembo
 James De Mille
 Gordon R. Dickson
 Candas Jane Dorsey
 Cory Doctorow
 Dave Duncan
 Amal El-Mohtar
 Steven Erikson
 Nigel Findley
 J.M. Frey
 Barb Galler-Smith
 James Alan Gardner
 Pauline Gedge
 Terence M. Green
 Ed Greenwood
 William Gibson
 Phyllis Gotlieb
 Hiromi Goto

H-P

 PJ Haarsma
 J. C. Hall
 H. A. Hargreaves
 Rachel Hartman
 Nalo Hopkinson
 Tanya Huff
 Matt Hughes
 Monica Hughes
 Tina Hunter
 Marie Jakober
 K.V. Johansen
 Karl Johanson
 Daniel Heath Justice
 Guy Gavriel Kay
 Eileen Kernaghan
 Crawford Kilian
 Donald Kingsbury
 W. H. C. Lawrence
 Mark Leslie
 Nicole Luiken
 Maggie MacDonald
 Nathalie Mallet
 Paul Marlowe
 Suzanne Martel
 Moira J. Moore
 Jim Munroe
 Nina Munteanu
 Francine Pelletier
 Fiona Patton

R-Z

 Mark A. Rayner
 Vincent Reid
 Spider Robinson
 Joel Rosenberg
 Sean Russell
 Geoff Ryman
 Michelle Sagara
 Liselle Sambury
 Lynsay Sands
 Charles R. Saunders
 Robert J. Sawyer
 Karl Schroeder
 Daniel Sernine
 William Shatner
 Lisa Smedman
 Linda Smith
 Caro Soles
 Steve Stanton
 S.M. Stirling
 Kenneth Tam
 Jean-Louis Trudel
 Elisabeth Vonarburg
 A. E. van Vogt
 Jo Walton
 Peter Watts
 Lynda Williams
 Robert Charles Wilson
 Evan Winter
 Tim Wynne-Jones
 Alexander Zelenyj

External links
  SF Canada, Canada's National Association for Speculative Fiction Professionals

Science fiction and fantasy

Canadian
Canadian